Stichophanes is a genus of snake in the family Colubridae  that contains the sole species Stichophanes ningshaanensis. It is commonly known as the Ningshaan kukri snake or Ningshan line-shaped snake.

It is found in Asia.

References 

Colubrids
Monotypic snake genera
Reptiles of China